Haddeby is an Amt ("collective municipality") in the district of Schleswig-Flensburg, in Schleswig-Holstein, Germany. It is situated on the south bank of the Schlei, southeast of Schleswig. The seat of the Amt is in Busdorf. It was named after the now ruined medieval trading settlement Hedeby.

The Amt Haddeby consists of the following municipalities (population in 2005 between brackets):

Borgwedel (714) 
Busdorf * (2,023) 
Dannewerk (1,072) 
Fahrdorf (2,578) 
Geltorf (422) 
Jagel (944) 
Lottorf (194) 
Selk (809)

References

Ämter in Schleswig-Holstein